Dan Salvemini is a former U.S. soccer player who spent time in the North American Soccer League, Major Indoor Soccer League and Western Soccer Alliance

Youth
Salvemini attended the University of California, Berkeley where he played on the Golden Bears soccer team from 1975 to 1978.  He finished his career at Cal with 54 goals and 17 assists to place him second on the career goals and points lists.   He also gained third team All-American recognition in 1976, 1977 and 1978.  Salvemini was inducted into the Golden Bears Hall of Fame in 1990.

Professional
In January 1979, the Washington Diplomats selected Salvemini in the first round (sixth overall) of the NASL Draft.  However, he injured his knee and had surgery a few days after the draft.  He sat out the entire 1979 season.  In 1980, Salvemini played a single season with the Philadelphia Fury in the North American Soccer League (NASL).  He spent the 1981-1982 season with the Philadelphia Fever in the Major Indoor Soccer League.  He played an unknown number of seasons with the Memphis Americans in the Major Indoor Soccer League.  He also played for the San Jose Earthquakes during the 1985 Western Alliance Challenge Series.  His brother Len also played professionally.

References

External links
 NASL/MISL stats

1957 births
Soccer players from San Francisco
American soccer players
California Golden Bears men's soccer players
Major Indoor Soccer League (1978–1992) players
Memphis Americans players
North American Soccer League (1968–1984) players
Philadelphia Fever (MISL) players
Philadelphia Fury (1978–1980) players
San Jose Earthquakes (1974–1988) players
Western Soccer Alliance players
Living people
Association football defenders